Link Click ("Time Agents") is a Chinese animated streaming television series produced by Studio LAN and Haoliners Animation League. It was first released on Bilibili and Funimation on April 30, 2021, and episodes were released every Friday at 11:00 until July 9. There are 12 episodes, one of which is a special episode named 5.5. There are also several chibi specials.

Synopsis
Cheng Xiaoshi and Lu Guang run Time Photo Studio and accept requests from clients to relieve them of regrets. Through a photo provided by the client, Cheng Xiaoshi can travel back in time to the moment it was taken and assumes the identity of its photographer, with him absorbing the photographer's memories and emotions in the process. At the same time, Lu Guang has the ability to keep track of the events in time and helps Cheng Xiaoshi relive the experiences of the photographer. The two work under the conditions that they have only 12 hours with one chance to travel in time and find what their client is searching for, while also leaving the events of the past unchanged.

Characters

Main characters
Cheng Xiaoshi  
Voiced by: Su Shangqing (Chinese), Alejandro Saab, Xanthe Huynh (young) (English)
The owner of Time Photo Studio. His ability is to enter the photo world and possess a designated person, and can control all the words and actions of that person.
Lu Guang  
Voiced by: Yang Tianxiang (Chinese), Zeno Robinson (English)
An associate of Time Photo Studio. His ability is to retrace everything that happened in the photo world within 12 hours of the photo being taken; he also directs Cheng Xiaoshi's actions.

Supporting characters
Qiao Ling  
Voiced by: Li Shimeng (Chinese), Suzie Yeung (English)
Cheng Xiaoshi's childhood friend and landlord and also the agent of Time Photo Studio.
Emma / Wú Lìhuá 
Voiced by: Zhào Yìtóng (赵熠彤) (Chinese), Xanthe Huynh (English)
Overworked secretary to the CFO at Quede Games (formerly) and client of Time Photo Studio.
Yu Xia 
Voiced by: Qián Chēn (钱琛) (Chinese), Morgan Garrett (English)
Client of Time Photo Studio who asks them to find the secret ingredient to her friend Lin Zhen's noodles after she left her to restart everything.
Lin Zhen 
Voiced by: Niè Xīyìng (聂曦映) (Chinese), Jad Saxton (English)
Yu Xia's closest friend and chef of their noodles. She ended up leaving Yu Xia's side after coming to terms with the fact she no longer enjoyed making the noodles Yu Xia once enjoyed.
Chen Xiao 
Voiced by: Wāi Wāi (歪歪) (Chinese)
A client who seeks out the Time Studio as he asks if they could simply deliver a message to some people from his past on the day of a basketball game. Qiao Ling notes that he looks incredibly tired and unhappy.
Liu Lei 
Voiced by: Gǔ Jiāngshān (谷江山) (Chinese)
Lu Hongbin 
Voiced by: Guān Shuài (关帅) (Chinese), Brandon McInnis (English)
Doudou 
Voiced by: Zǐ Zǐ (仔仔) (Chinese), Cherami Leigh (English)
A young boy who is kidnapped. The Time Photo Studio looks for clues to secure the boy's rescue.
Xiao Li  
Voiced by: Tútè Hāméng (图特哈蒙) (Chinese), Christopher Sabat (English)
The police chief who requests the aide of Time Photo Studio.
Xu Shanshan  
Voiced by: Zhào Shuǎng (赵爽) (Chinese), Lynn (Japanese), Caitlin Glass (English)
A school friend of Qiao Ling, Cheng Xiaoshi and Lu Guang who comes to them seeking help when she can't remember what Dong Yi told her when she was drunk.
Dong Yi  
Voiced by: Jīn Xián (金弦) (Chinese)
Xu Shanshan's friend who enjoys hanging out with her and uses every excuse he can to stay by her side.
Liu Min 
Voiced by: Sūn Lùlù (孙路路) (Chinese), Kengo Kawanishi (Japanese), Daman Mills (English)
A mysterious man who seems to be connected to a string of murders that have been occurring in the story. Son of the CEO of Quede Games.

Media

Donghua
The donghua was released on bilibili and Funimation on 30 April 2021. The series is directed by Li Haoling, original character design by INPLICK, art directed by Tanji Takumi, Asami Tomoya and Zhu Lipiao, photography directed by Sanjou Yasuka, and chief animation directed by LAN. The second season of the donghua series was announced at the ending of the episode 11.

A Japanese dub of the series premiered on January 9, 2022, on Tokyo MX and BS11. Crunchyroll premiered an English dub on August 8, 2022.

Anime

Episode list

OVA
An additional episode was released between episodes 5 and 6 of season 1. This episode does not connect significantly with the remainder of the episodes in the season.

Chibi
Troubles of Ordinary People (逍遥散人的委托) special was released on August 27, 2021. 

Since October, 2021 a new chibi series titled "The Daily Life in Lighttime" started releasing on Bilibili on the 10th of every month.

Music

References

External links
  at bilibili
  at Funimation

Chinese animated television series
Chinese web series
Crunchyroll anime
Mandarin-language television shows